KingsRow is a strong checkers and draughts engine. It was released by Ed Gilbert in 2000.

The checkers engine can be used with the CheckerBoard GUI. The engine is available as freeware.

History
In the only Computer Checkers World Championship, KingsRow took second place behind Nemesis.

KingsRow was stronger than Cake++ in the early years. Cake++ finally caught up with KingsRow and gradually became stronger. 
It competed a 624-game match against Cake++ on Thanksgiving 2004; Cake++ won 3 to 1, with 620 games ending in a draw.
On July 17, 2005, Ed Gilbert completed building a 10-piece endgame database for use with KingsRow.

A version for Italian checkers with a nine-piece endgame tablebase is available, too.

Draughts version 
A 10x10 version of KingsRow was started in 2007. In 2009, an eight-piece endgame tablebase was finished.
With checkers solved, and all top engine matches ending in draws only; KingsRow only focuses on 10x10 draughts today.

External links
KingsRow Webpage
KingsRow Italian

Computer draughts players
2000 software